Émile Pouvroux (16 January 1901 – 25 July 1988) was a French wrestler. He competed in the freestyle lightweight event at the 1924 Summer Olympics.

References

External links
 

1901 births
1988 deaths
Olympic wrestlers of France
Wrestlers at the 1924 Summer Olympics
French male sport wrestlers
Place of birth missing
20th-century French people